Jonas Arčikauskas  (born 1957 in Patilčiai) is a Lithuanian ceramic artist, and set designer.

Life
He studied at the Art Institute in Vilnius (1980–85) in ceramics and theatre set design. 
He was invited to work in the Kaunas Drama Theatre as a set designer (1985). 
Since 1984, he participated in exhibitions, since 1990 is a member of the group “Angis”.
He teaches in the Chair of Ceramics of the Vilnius Art Academy.
In 2009, he was a McKnight Fellow.

Set design 
 The River (1989)
 Caligula (1989)
 The City-Stick (1992)
 Love’s Labour Lost (1996)
 A Doll’s House (1996)
 The Seagull (2001)
 Andre Chenier (1999)
 Salome (1997)
 Golgotha, A Dream (1995)
 The Marriage of Figaro, 1999
 Jeanne d’Arc at the Stake (1998)
 A Christmas Tree at the Ivanovs' (Stockholm, 1997)

See also
List of Lithuanian painters

References

1957 births
Living people
People from Vilkaviškis District Municipality
20th-century ceramists
Academic staff of the Vilnius Academy of Arts
21st-century ceramists
Lithuanian ceramists
Set designers